Hasan Pasha (died 1768), known by the epithets Uzun Hasan Pasha ("the Tall") or Macar Hasan Pasha ("the Hungarian") or Hacı Hasan Pasha ("the Hajji") or Kazıkçı Hasan Pasha ("the Swindler"), was an Ottoman statesman and admiral.

Hasan Pasha served as Kapudan Pasha (grand admiral of the Ottoman Navy) from February to December 1764 and also served as the Ottoman governor of Cyprus (1762), Eğriboz (1762–64), Egypt (1764–65), Van (1767), Marash (1767–68), Trikala (1768), and Belgrade (1768). He died in Belgrade while still in office in 1768.

He had his origins in the Janissary corps of the Ottoman army.

See also
 List of Kapudan Pashas
 List of Ottoman governors of Egypt

References

1768 deaths
18th-century Ottoman military personnel
18th-century Ottoman governors of Egypt
Ottoman governors of Egypt
Year of birth unknown